Taxeotis stereospila, the oval-spot taxeotis, is a moth of the family Geometridae. The species was first described by Edward Meyrick in 1890 and it is found in Australia.

References

Moths of Australia
Oenochrominae
Moths described in 1890